John Fox Watson (31 December 1917 – 15 April 1976) was a Scottish football player, believed to be the only Scottish player in Real Madrid's history. He was one of the first players from the British Isles to sign for a high-profile side abroad, leading the way for players like John Charles, Jimmy Greaves and Denis Law in the following decades.

Biography
Watson was born in Hamilton during Hogmanay, at the end of 1917. Watson started his career at Douglas Water Thistle Juniors before signing with English side Bury for whom he made his Football League debut in February 1939, ahead of World War II. After the war, he played with Fulham until 1948.

In 1948, Watson joined Englishman Mike Keeping, a fellow former Fulham player, at Spanish giants Real Madrid as a player. In his one season in Madrid, Watson played just one match, a 3–1 defeat away to Celta Vigo. He signed for the club during a period of unprecedented change; president Santiago Bernabéu Yeste had just been appointed, and Watson had come in just six months after the opening of the New Chamartin, later renamed the Estadio Santiago Bernabéu. He is believed to be the only Scottish player to play for Real Madrid.

Watson returned to England in 1949 to join Crystal Palace, making 63 appearances in two seasons before joining non-league Canterbury City. He died on 15 April 1976, aged 58.

References

1917 births
1976 deaths
Scottish footballers
Bury F.C. players
Fulham F.C. players
Real Madrid CF players
Crystal Palace F.C. players
Canterbury City F.C. players
Scottish expatriate footballers
Expatriate footballers in Spain
English Football League players
La Liga players
Footballers from Hamilton, South Lanarkshire
Scottish expatriate sportspeople in Spain
Brentford F.C. wartime guest players
Scottish Junior Football Association players
Douglas Water Thistle F.C. players
Association football central defenders